The Santa Cruz ground dove (Pampusana sanctaecrucis) is a species of bird in the family Columbidae.
It is found in the southern Solomon Islands and Vanuatu.
Its natural habitat is subtropical or tropical moist lowland forests.
It is threatened by habitat loss.

This species was formerly in the genus Alopecoenas Sharpe, 1899, but the name of the genus was changed in 2019 to Pampusana Bonaparte, 1855 as this name has priority.

References

External links
BirdLife Species Factsheet.

Santa Cruz ground dove
Birds of the Santa Cruz Islands
Birds of Vanuatu
Santa Cruz ground dove
Taxonomy articles created by Polbot
Taxobox binomials not recognized by IUCN